Douglas Municipal Airport may refer to:

 Douglas Municipal Airport (Arizona) in Douglas, Arizona, United States (FAA/IATA: DGL)
 Douglas Municipal Airport (Georgia) in Douglas, Georgia, United States (FAA: DQH)
 Douglas Municipal Airport (Wyoming) in Douglas, Wyoming, United States (closed)